The Bowers Bluff Middens Archeological District  is a U.S. historic district (designated as such on February 1, 1980) located approximately five miles southeast of Astor, Florida.

References

External links
 Lake County listings at National Register of Historic Places
 Lake County listings at Florida's Office of Cultural and Historical Programs

Native American history of Florida
Archaeological sites in Florida
National Register of Historic Places in Lake County, Florida
Historic districts on the National Register of Historic Places in Florida